= Francis Moltino =

Italian painter

Francis Moltino (1818–1888) was a 19th-century English landscape painter. Most biographical accounts give his place of birth as Milan, Austrian Empire but this is incorrect. Francis Moltino was in fact born Frank George Owen Moulton in Norfolk and no doubt changed his name and reinvented himself to sound more exotic. Moltino married Elizabeth Nockold in 1834 and moved to London in the 1840s.

Between 1847 and 1867 he exhibited at the Royal Academy, the British Institution, and the Royal Society of British Artists. Moltino specialised in atmospheric cityscapes of the river Thames and Victorian London, and in particular vedute scenes of Venice in the style of J. M. W. Turner. Moltino died in Wandsworth, South London in April 1888.
